goatse.cx ("goat sex"), often spelled without the .cx top-level domain as Goatse, is an internet domain that originally housed an Internet shock site. Its front page featured a picture entitled hello.jpg, showing a close-up of a hunched-over naked man using both hands to stretch open his anus and expose his rectum, which was lit red by the camera flash.

The photo became a surprise image and Internet meme, and has been used in bait-and-switch pranks, prevention of hot-linking in a hostile manner, and defacement of websites, in order to provoke extreme reactions. Even though the image from the site was taken down in January 2004, mirror websites are widespread.

History

Website
The website's domain was originally registered in 1999, the early form of the site only consisted of two pages, both of which had images noted for their shock value.:
"the receiver", the main index page, titled "eh", contained hello.jpg.
"the giver", titled "woah", contained a manipulated photograph of a man reclining on a boat with a large penis reaching up to his chest, suggesting that the man in the first image is stretching his anus to accommodate the giant penis.

In June 2000, a Feedback page was added to the site, which contained various emails from readers, alongside a index page content disclaimer warning above. A link to a defunct website called biganal.com was added in August. Later additions to the site by Mid-2001 were links to other defunct websites such as dolphinsex.org and urinalpoop.org, and a subpage called "contrib", which consisted of a collection of homages and parodies of the images received from readers.

The website was updated again in November 2002, adding a warning below the image about unofficial goatse.cx merchandise, with a reassurance that official merchandise would be made available.

Domain suspension
On January 14, 2004, the domain name goatse.cx was suspended by Christmas Island Internet Administration due to Acceptable Use Policy violations in response to a complaint, but many mirrors of the site are still available, remaining on display on many other websites. A Christmas Island resident filed the complaint that resulted in the suspension of goatse.cx's domain name.

Sale of domain name
In January 2007, the Christmas Island Internet Administration put the domain goatse.cx back into the available domain pool. At this time, the domain housed a typosquatting-like site about financing.

The domain was subsequently registered on January 16 through domain registrar Variomedia, and the registrant tried to auction the right to use the domain.

An early attempt to offer the domain for sale by SEOBidding placed the reserve at $120, which was not met.

The goatse.cx domain name was reportedly sold at an auction on April 30, 2007 to an unknown bidder. According to SEOBidding.com, the first auction ended with fake bids so the auction was reactivated. This was again won by fake bidders, so in July SEOBidding.com announced that the website would be sold for $500,000 and that legal action would be pursued against the fake bidders. In October, the website redirected to a Sedo holding page, stylized as a search engine. On November 25, 2007, and continuing as of June 2010, the site was still for sale, listed as: "goatse.cx  Asking: $50,200  minimum".

First relaunch
On July 4, 2008, the website was relaunched and became home to a parody of the original site, with the "Hello.jpg" image replaced with an image of Bill O'Reilly, although the file name and alt text remained the same as before, with red text above mentioning about the website still being for sale. This image was later replaced in December with another showcasing a stylized representation of hello.jpg, which featured a pair of silver robotic hands 'stretching' a metallic, circular wall aperture in what appears to be a futuristic factory setting, with a photoshopped image of the character Gumby next to it. Above the image was a link to a site called imagechan.com.

The October 21, 2009 edition of the Rick Latona "Daily Domains" newsletter advertised the goatse.cx domain for sale at an asking price of $15,000, noting it as being a "famous site, [with] tons of backlinks".

In April 2010, the site was updated after almost a year, containing an announcement for an emailing service called "Goatse Stinger 2.0" that was planned to go into beta on May 9, 2010. The website also added a Yahoo! mailing list, and a sketch with hands spreading wide a view onto a mailing envelope, parodying Hello.jpg. this was later revealed to be a planned email service at the site. This was never updated beyond that point, and by June 2011, the "www." version of the website began redirecting to a web-hosting company's website.

Second relaunch
In October 2012, it was announced that the goatse.cx domain had been acquired by a new owner, who was advertising a forthcoming webmail service to give users access to goatse.cx email addresses. The domain, at that time, redirected to signup.goatse.cx, which said the service would be "launching in early December 2012 for limited release". By 2013, the website had launched an Indiegogo account for supplying the email addresses.

In January 2014, the site announced that it was preparing to launch its own cryptocurrency, the "Goatse Coin". The website was later updated to reflect this. By July, the website featured a YouTube video promoting Dogecoin. In December, the website announced to be offering subdomains.

Use as cryptocurrency website
In August 2017, the website became home to a crypto website different from the "Goatse Coin" incarnation, offering up a Cryptocurrency titled the "Goatseum", activating as a ethereum site. By October, the website announced plans for a meme cryptocurrency service, with the news section mentioning its past history of being an internet meme.

On November 18, 2018, after a period of maintenance, the website became home to a page where advertisers could buy pixels for ethereum.

Current state
As of May 2022, the site currently redirects to a Sedo parked domain page, containing no content related to Goatse.

Reception, parodies and subsequent usage

Because many Internet users have been tricked into viewing the site or a mirror of the site at one time or another, it has become an Internet meme.
On November 24, 2000, the Goatse "giver" and "receiver" images were posted to the official online Oprah Winfrey Message Boards in the Soul Stories board. Trystan T. Cotten and Kimberly Springer, authors of Stories of Oprah: the Oprahfication of American Culture, said that this "seemingly considerable male intrusion drove many of the women elsewhere, and the board was retired shortly afterwards". Slashdot altered its threaded discussion forum display software because "users made a sport out of tricking unsuspecting readers into visiting [goatse.cx]".
The Los Angeles Times Wikitorial was introduced on June 17, 2005, to be a publicly accessible method of directly responding to the paper's editorials; Wikipedia co-founder Jimmy Wales had consulted on the project, and on its first day contributed a "forking" of the page to accommodate opposing opinions. Prior to the feature's introduction, L.A. Times editorial and opinion editor Michael Kinsley stated that "Wikitorials may be one of those things that within six months will be standard. It's the ultimate in reader participation".  The wiki was closed two days later on June 19, 2005, because, The Guardian reported, "explicit images known as Goatses appeared on [it]".

The practice of using goatse.cx as a "fake" link to shock friends became popular, according to ROFLcon organizer Tim Hwang in an interview on NPR, because
it's ... the spectacle of the thing, right? You really want to be there when the person is seeing it. To the extent that there's all these sites online of sort of people taking pictures of their friends and showing them Goatse... [In photos online,] It's like thousands and thousands of people looking really shocked or disgusted. It's really great.

The goatse.cx image has been used by website authors to discourage other sites from hot-linking to them. By replacing the hot-linked image with an embarrassing image when hot-linking has been discovered, an unsubtle message is sent to the offending website's operators, visible to all who view the web page in question. In 2007, Wired.com hot-linked to another site in an article about the "sexiest geeks of 2007"; the site subsequently swapped the hot-linked image with one from goatse.cx.

Images on the site such as hello.jpg and others have become subjects of parodies, mirrors, and tributes.

Following Hurricane Charley in August 2004, a photograph purporting to show "the hands of God" in the cloud formations in the aftermath of the disaster circulated via email. The image was eventually proven to be a parody, the clouds having been photo-manipulated to include hands, as in the hello.jpg image.<ref>Mikkelson, Barbara and David P. (June 15, 2007). "The Hands of God". snopes.com; Snopes. Retrieved November 14, 2011.</ref>

Disc images supposedly containing a leaked Mac OS X build, OSx86, which could run on standard "x86 architecture" computers, were distributed during 2005 on BitTorrent filesharing networks. But rather than load the expected Mac OS, the discs reportedly displayed the Goatse image when booted.

In his book The Long Tail (2008), Chris Anderson wrote that goatse.cx is well-known only to a relatively small Internet-using "subcultural tribe" who reference it as a "shared context joke" or "secret membership code". Anderson cited a photo accompanying an "otherwise innocuous article" about Google in the June 2, 2005 The New York Times, in which Anil Dash wore a T-shirt emblazoned with stylized hands stretching out the word "Goatse".

In June 2007, a proposed sketch of the 2012 Summer Olympics logo appeared on the BBC News 24 broadcast and website (requires Flash; archive URL may or may not work) as one of the 12 best viewer-submitted alternatives to the official logo. In it, two hands stretched the "0" wide in "2012", as the submitter wrote, "to reveal the Olympics". The sketch was later shown as part of a gallery of viewers logos on BBC London News and BBC News 24, and was subsequently removed from the website. The editor of the BBC News website acknowledged the mistake in his blog, saying his team "simply didn’t spot it".

In June 2010, a group of computer experts known as Goatse Security exposed a flaw in AT&T's security which allowed the e-mail addresses of iPad users to be revealed. Andrew Auernheimer (alias weev), a member of the group, was interviewed by the media and discussed the group's name, among other things. The group uses a stylized cartoon of the cropped goatse.cx image as their logo and has the motto "Gaping Holes Exposed".

In April 2011 an Audi billboard campaign was reported by multiple people as showing an image similar to the Goatse image. One article author asks, "unintentionally hilarious or intentionally evil?"McGinley, Tara (April 22, 2011). "Audi's unintentional Goatse" . Dangerous Minds.The Register reported that Scottish TV News, while reporting on a hacking incident, unintentionally broadcast a link to Goatse images while showing the LulzSec Twitter feed on the victim site, which read, "For anyone that doesn't know what goatse is, check it out here, it's really eye-opening: [link]".

In May 2015, pranksters displayed Goatse on a digital billboard in Buckhead, Atlanta, Georgia.

Pranksters signed the PGP keys of Facebook and Adrian Lamo with ASCII art of Goatse.

During the 2010s circulated an urban legend alleging the Nokia N-Gage design was based on Goatse by a disgruntled engineer.

In 2022, several mods for the game Garry's Mod were noted to have been altered to cause "pornographic jumpscares" of the Goatse image. An article from PC Gamer described the image as "really upsetting" and noted the prominence of the mod in the game's community leading to many being affected. Some modders on Steam Workshop started to make censored versions of the altered mods.

In September of 2022, news media reported multiple incidents across the US of users of the elementary school interactive app Seesaw having their accounts compromised in order to post links to the image in parent-teacher chatrooms. Seesaw later removed the images and stated that the breach had only affected the accounts of individual users with insecure credentials.

 U.S. jurisprudence
On 20 September 2013, the United States Department of Justice filed a response brief in the United States Court of Appeals for the Third Circuit in United States v. Auernheimer, an appeal in a criminal case from the United States District Court for the District of New Jersey, which involved the access of AT&T customers' email addresses by Goatse Security. The brief explains on page three that "The firm's name is a reference to a notoriously obscene internet shock site" and includes a footnote which reads "For a more graphic description, see http://en.wikipedia.org/wiki/Goatse." The fact that a brief filed in a U.S. federal appellate court linked to a page about Goatse, even if only a Wikipedia article, caused a stir on social media.

See also

.cx
Rickrolling
List of Internet phenomena
Goatse Security

References

External links
 goatse.cx, archive of original site at the Internet Archive Wayback Machine.
 "Lazy Guide to Net Culture: NSFW" – The Scotsman''

 Goatse at Know Your Meme

1990s photographs
Color photographs
Defunct websites
Domain hacks
Internet memes introduced in the 1990s
Internet properties disestablished in 2004
Internet properties established in 1999
Internet services shut down by a legal challenge
Shock sites